Yaw Ackah (born 1 June 1999) is a Ghanaian professional footballer who plays as a midfielder for Turkish club Kayserispor.

Professional career
Ackah joined the youth academy of Boavista in 2017 from Bechem United. Ackah made his professional debut for Boavista in a 4-2 Primeira Liga win over S.C. Braga on 11 May 2019.

After making  24 appearances for Boavista in the 2019/20 campaign, Ackah joined Turkish Super League side Kayserispor for a three-year deal with the club after a successful medical ahead of the 2020–2021 season.

International career
Ackah was called up to the preliminary squad for the Ghana U20s for the 2019 Africa U-20 Cup of Nations.

References

External links
 
 

1999 births
Living people
Ghanaian footballers
Ghana under-20 international footballers
Boavista F.C. players
Primeira Liga players
Association football midfielders
Ghanaian expatriate footballers
Expatriate footballers in Portugal